San Juan Ermita is a municipality in the Chiquimula department of Guatemala. It has a population of 16,418 (2018 census) and cover an area of 80.5 km2.

References

Municipalities of the Chiquimula Department